Mount Harrison can refer to:

 Mount Harrison (Antarctica)
 Mount Harrison (British Columbia), Canada; see List of the most prominent summits of Canada
 Mount Harrison (Yukon), Canada; see List of the most prominent summits of Canada
 Mount Harrison (Idaho), U.S.
 Mount Harrison, one of the seven hills of Cincinnati, Ohio, U.S.
 Mount Harrison, Tennessee; see Ober Gatlinburg

See also
 Mount Hardison